Hermleigh Independent School District is a public school district based in the community of Hermleigh, Texas (USA). It was founded in 1907.  Located in southeastern Scurry County, a small portion of the district extends into southwestern Fisher County.

Academic achievement
In 2009, the school district was rated "academically acceptable" by the Texas Education Agency.

Student demographics
Hermleigh ISD student demographic figures as of the 2005–2006 school year:

Schools
Hermleigh ISD has one school that is composed of two campuses - secondary (junior high/high; grades 6-12) and elementary (grades K-5).

Special programs

Athletics
Hermleigh High School plays six-man football.

See also

List of school districts in Texas

References

External links

School districts in Scurry County, Texas
School districts in Fisher County, Texas
School districts established in 1907
1907 establishments in Texas